Henry Wilson (1778 – August 14, 1826) was a member of the U.S. House of Representatives from Pennsylvania.

Henry Wilson was born in Dauphin, Pennsylvania.  He completed preparatory studies, studied law in Harrisburg, Pennsylvania, was admitted to the bar December 21, 1812, and commenced practice in Allentown, Pennsylvania.  He served as prothonotary and clerk of Lehigh County Courts from 1815 to 1821.

Wilson was elected to the Eighteenth and Nineteenth Congresses and served until his death in Allentown in 1826.  Interment in Union Cemetery.

See also
List of United States Congress members who died in office (1790–1899)

Sources

The Political Graveyard

Politicians from Harrisburg, Pennsylvania
Politicians from Allentown, Pennsylvania
Pennsylvania prothonotaries
Pennsylvania lawyers
1778 births
1826 deaths
Democratic-Republican Party members of the United States House of Representatives from Pennsylvania
Jacksonian members of the United States House of Representatives from Pennsylvania
19th-century American politicians